Humberto Luís Rodrigues Barbosa, (born 8 August 1961 in Funchal, Madeira) is a Portuguese nutritionist.

He completed his college education in England in 1983 when he obtained a PhD in nutrition.
In 1983, he submitted to the Academy of Sciences of Rome a scientific thesis in Psychology and Nutrition, and was awarded a merit gold medal in Psycho-Biological Sciences.
In 1986, he published that thesis in a book in Portugal, as an author's Edition "Nutrition - The Science of Health" (Barbosa, Humberto - "Nutrition - The Science of Health". Lisbon: Nave, [D.L. 1988]. 123 p.).

In 1992, he founded a nutrition clinic in Parede, municipality of Cascais, Portugal, where he introduced, in 1997, the specialty of Orthomolecular Nutrition. In 1999, this clinic was franchised and under his clinical direction other units were opened throughout the country (Portugal-Mainland and Islands) and one in Spain (Madrid).

He created a method in nutritional psychology he called "Consultation of Nutrition, Weight Control, Alimentary Re-education and Revitalization" for which he obtained, in 2002, the Qualicert certificate, Certificate of Conformity No. 9332/38/61600/SO102, awarded by SGS ICS – International Certification Services. That was the first quality certification awarded in Portugal in that same field.

In 2007, after more than 20 years of professional practice in the nutritional-care, he published his second book about the Portuguese eating habits and need for alimentary re-education.

He regularly participates in radio and television thematic shows, besides being a chronicler in several publications in social media like VIP Magazine, and in specialty publications like "Health and Wellness".

He currently continues his clinical practice and research on nutrition and anti-aging treatments in Parede, at his clinic "Clínica do Tempo".

Selected publications

Books

References

External links
 Official Website, Clínica do Tempo
 Official Website, Dr. Humberto Barbosa
 25 YEARS Dr. Humberto Barbosa
 UBI, Nutrition Faculty of Health Sciences
 Fama, Interview with Humberto Barbosa
 Máxima, Always in shape
 nucase, Humberto Barbosa and "the elixir of eternal youth"

Portuguese nutritionists
1961 births
Living people
People from Cascais
People from Funchal